Thomas Gregory Cunningham (30 November 1901 – 5 December 1964) was an Australian rules footballer who played with St Kilda and Richmond in the Victorian Football League (VFL).

Family
He is the brother of Melbourne footballer Dan Cunningham, the father of Hawthorn footballer Jack Cunningham, and the grandfather of Geelong footballer John Cunningham.

Football
He played his last game of football, for Nar Nar Goon, at the age of 43.

Death
He died at Pakenham, Victoria on 5 December 1964.

Notes

References
 Hogan P: The Tigers Of Old, Richmond FC, (Melbourne), 1996.

External links 

1901 births
1964 deaths
Australian rules footballers from Melbourne
St Kilda Football Club players
Richmond Football Club players
People from Werribee, Victoria